The St. Peter's Basilica  also called St. Peter's Church Is a Catholic church built in neoclassical style in the parish of Oliveira, São Paio and São Sebastião, Guimaraes in the north of the European country of Portugal.

Its origin dates back to the beginning of the 17th century, although the work only began in 1737. By 1750 the chapel was blessed. The formal completion of the work was between 1883 and 1884, although the façade had not been completed, and the second bell tower is still missing.

The cathedral was desecrated during the Napoleonic Wars and was used as a stable. It received the title of minor basilica in 1751 from Pope Benedict XIV. The basilica follows a neoclassical style, very austere and simple.

On December 1, 1942, after the "Missa das Almas", a few hundred poor people gathered in the top floor of the basilica to receive free soup and bread, but the weight of the same was so much that the floor collapsed, leading to the death of 10 people and injuring many more.

See also
Guimarães(city)
Basilicas in Europe
Roman Catholicism in Portugal
St. Peter's Basilica

References

Basilica churches in Portugal
Roman Catholic churches completed in 1884
19th-century Roman Catholic church buildings in Portugal